Veronica Henry (born 1963) is a British writer of Romance novels, TV script writer and journalist. In 2014, her novel A Night on the Orient Express won the Romantic Novel of the Year Award by the Romantic Novelists' Association.

Biography
Veronica Henry was educated both in the UK and the US. She attended the Royal School for Daughters of Officers of the Army, moving eventually on to the University of Bristol to study Classics.

Her first job in the media was with the BBC where she secured a job on The Archers. Her duties ranged from organising Shula Archer's wedding photographs with Patrick Lichfield to acting the part of Peaches the barmaid in the Cat and Fiddle. She also wrote several episodes for this radio show.

From there she went to Central Television to script-edit Crossroads and Boon. She left to have her first child in 1990, and became a scriptwriter for UK television. Her UK script writing TV credits include Boon, Heartbeat, Doctors, Family Affairs and Crossroads. She is a member of the Holby City writing team.

In 2000 she turned to writing novels, and in 2002, her first book, Honeycote, was published by Penguin Books (UK). Her other publishers include Orion Books (UK) and Random House (US).

On 17 March 2014, A Night on the Orient Express won Romantic Novel of the Year, and her award was presented by Darcey Bussell CBE.

She lives on the coast in North Devon with her three sons.

Bibliography

Honeycote Saga
1. Honeycote (2002): softcover, Penguin Books, Limited, .

Honeycote: hardcover, Chivers Press, .
Honeycote: softcover, Chivers Press, 
2. Making Hay (2003): softcover, Penguin Books, Limited, .

Making Hay: softcover, Paragon House Publishers, .
Making Hay: hardcover, Chivers Press, .
3. Just A Family Affair (2008): softcover, Orion Books Limited, .

Just A Family Affair: hardcover, Orion Books Limited, .

Beach Hut series
 The Beach Hut (2010): softcover, Orion Books Limited, .
 The Beach Hut Next Door (2014)
 Christmas at the Beach Hut (2018)
 A Wedding at the Beach Hut (2020)

Single novels
Wild Oats (2004): softcover, Penguin Books, Limited, .
An Eligible Bachelor (2005): softcover, Penguin Books, Limited, .

An Eligible Bachelor: softcover, Crown Publishing Group, 
Love on the Rocks (2006): softcover, Penguin Books, Limited, .

Love on the Rocks: hardcover, Chivers Audio Books, .
Love on the Rocks: hardcover, BBC Audiobooks, .
Love on the Rocks: hardcover, Penguin Books, Limited, .
 Marriage And Other Games (2009): softcover, Orion Books Limited, .
 The Birthday Party (2010)
 The Long Weekend (2012)
 A Night on the Orient Express (2013)
 A Sea Change (2013)
 High Tide (2015)
 How to Find Love in a Bookshop (2016)
 The Forever House (2017)
 A Family Recipe (2018)
 A Home From Home (2019)

References

External links 
 The Internet Movie Database list of UK TV Scripts as Veronica Henry
 The Internet Movie Database list of UK TV Scripts as Ronnie Henry
 Shortlisted for the 2006 RNA book award
 List of music contributions during 1980's and 1990s on Discogs.com
 Interview for Orion Books with Danuta Kean
 Published articles by Veronica Henry

1963 births
Living people
English women novelists
British women screenwriters
English screenwriters
People educated at the Royal School for Daughters of Officers of the Army
RoNA Award winners
British romantic fiction writers
Women romantic fiction writers